Nemacerota griseobasalis is a moth in the family Drepanidae. It was described by Sick in 1941. It is found in China (Yunnan).

References

Moths described in 1941
Thyatirinae